Třebonice is a village in central Bohemia, Czech Republic. It was founded in the thirteenth century, and became part of Prague in 1968. It is now part of the Prague 5 administrative district, and the local government districts of Prague 13 and Prague 17. Třebonice is part of Zličín and Řeporyje.

The area is 4.58 km2, the population is 461 and the population density is 101 inhabitants / km2.

Třebonice also includes the settlements of Chaby and Krteň (currently unoccupied). There are plans to build a new district, to be called Západní Město (West Town), which will extend towards Třebonice.

Třebonice is served by a station at Zličín, on Prague Metro Line B.

References 

Districts of Prague